Asian American history is the history of ethnic and racial groups in the United States who are of Asian descent. The term "Asian American" was an idea invented in the 1960s to bring together Chinese, Japanese, and Filipino Americans for strategic political purposes. Soon other groups of Asian origin, such as Korean, Vietnamese, Iu Mien, Hmong, and other South Asian Americans were added.  For example, while many Chinese, Japanese, and Filipino immigrants arrived as unskilled workers in significant numbers from 1850 to 1905 and largely settled in Hawaii and California, many Vietnamese, Cambodian, and Hmong Americans arrived in the United States as refugees following the Vietnam War. These separate histories have often been overlooked in conventional frameworks of Asian American history.

Since 1965, shifting immigration patterns have resulted in a higher proportion of highly educated Asian immigrants entering the United States. This image of success is often referred to as the "model minority" myth. For the contemporary situation, see Asian Americans.

Hostility to immigration

The Chinese arrived in the U.S. in large numbers on the West Coast in the 1850s and 1860s to work in the gold mines and railroads. They encountered very strong opposition—violent as riots and physical attacks forced them out of the gold mines. The Central Pacific railroad hired thousands, but after the line was finished in 1869 they were hounded out of many railroad towns in states such as Wyoming and Nevada. Most wound up in Chinatowns—areas of large cities which the police largely ignored. The Chinese were further alleged to be "coolies" and were said to be not suitable for becoming independent thoughtful voters because of their control by tongs. The same negative reception hit the Asians who migrated to Mexico and Canada.

The Japanese arrived in large numbers 1890–1907, many going to Hawaii (an independent country until 1898), and others to the West Coast. Hostility was very high on the West Coast. Hawaii was a multicultural society in which the Japanese experienced about the same level of distrust as other groups. Indeed, they were the largest population group by 1910, and after 1950 took political control of Hawaii. The Japanese on the West Coast of the U.S. (as well as Canada and Latin America) were interned during World War II, but very few on Hawaii at the Honouliuli Internment Camp.

Historiography
According to Chan (1996), the historiography of Asians in America falls into four periods. The 1870s to the 1920s saw partisan debates over curtailing Chinese and Japanese immigration; "Yellow Peril" diatribes battled strong, missionary-based defenses of the immigrants. Studies written from the 1920s to the 1960s were dominated by social scientists, who focused on issues of assimilation and social organization, as well as the World War II internment camps. Activist revisionism marked the 1960s to the early 1980s. Starting in the early 1980s there was an increased stress on human agency. Only after 1990 has there been much scholarship by professional historians.

Chronology 
Major milestones according to standard reference works and others are:

16th century
 1587, "Luzonians" (Filipinos from Luzon Island) arrive in Morro Bay, (San Luis Obispo) California on board the galleon ship Nuestra Señora de Buena Esperanza under the command of Spanish Captain Pedro de Unamuno during the Manila Galleon Trade.
 1595, Filipino sailors aboard a Spanish "galleon" the San Agustin which was commanded by Captain Sebastian Rodriguez Cermeno arrive on the shores of Point Reyes outside the mouth of the Bay Area. The ship was on a trip to Acapulco before it was shipwrecked on the aforementioned area.

17th century
 1635, an "East Indian" is listed in Jamestown, Virginia.

18th century
 1763
Notice for a captured suspected runaway slave on July 20, 1763, "not resembling the African negros", born in Bombay and spoke good English
Filipinos established the small settlement of Saint Malo in the bayous of Louisiana, after fleeing mistreatment aboard Spanish ships. Since there were no Filipino women with them, the "Manilamen," as they were known, married Cajun and Native American women.
 1768–1794, Records of three escaped slaves of East Indian ethnicities documented in Virginia and Philadelphia
 1775–1783
At least 100 or more Asian-Americans lived in the Thirteen Colonies around the time of the American Revolution.
Four well-documented Asian-Americans are known to have fought in the American Revolution (two serving with the American Continentals and two with the British)
 1778, Chinese sailors first arrive to Hawaii. Many settled and married Hawaiian women.
 1779, Malays were listed as one of the many ethnicities who were part of the crew of the USS Bonhomme Richard during the Battle of Flamborough Head
 1785, Chinese sailors of an American ship reached Baltimore.
 1798, A tombstone in Boston was dedicated to a person named Chow Mandarin, aged 19, who was born in Canton and died falling off a ship's masthead on September 11, 1798.

19th century
 1815, Filipinos working as shrimp fishermen and smugglers in Louisiana serve under General Andrew Jackson's American forces in the War of 1812 and as artillery gunners at the Battle of New Orleans.
 1820s, Chinese (mostly merchants, sailors, and students) begin to immigrate via Sino-U.S. maritime trade.
 1829, Famous conjoined twins Chang and Eng Bunker, both born in Siam (modern-day Thailand), began performing on a series of tours in Boston, New York, and Philadelphia, with a Siamese translator brought along to help translate for Chang and Eng. Chang and Eng became naturalized US citizens in the 1830s and settled down in North Carolina. Two of their sons with their American wives later fought for the Confederacy during the American Civil War. 
 1835, First account of Chinese laborers on Hawaii by an American, who were noted to perform efficient, backbreaking work compared to indigenous Hawaiian laborers. In response, an Anglo-American entrepreneur hires the first Chinese paid laborers in Hawaii and recommends the importation of Chinese laborers to the Continental US. 
 1841, Captain Whitfield, commanding an American whaler in the Pacific, rescues five shipwrecked Japanese sailors. Four disembark at Honolulu. Manjiro Nakahama stays on board returning with Whitfield to Fairhaven, Massachusetts. After attending school in New England and adopting the name John Manjiro, he later becomes an interpreter for Commodore Matthew Perry.
 1849, First mass wave of Chinese immigrants to the US for gold prospecting including in states such as California, North Dakota, and South Dakota. In 1852, 20,000 Chinese-Americans migrated to California, totaling 67,000 Chinese immigrants in California. In response to increased Chinese immigration, the California legislature passed a new foreign miner's tax of $4 a month.
 1850, Seventeen survivors of a Japanese shipwreck were saved by an American freighter; In 1852, the group joins Commodore Matthew Perry to help open diplomatic relations with Japan. One of them, Joseph Heco (Hikozo Hamada) later becomes a naturalized US citizen.
 1854
People v. Hall, the California Supreme Court case that denied the rights of Chinese immigrants and Chinese Americans to testify against white citizens.
 Yung Wing becomes the first Chinese-American student to graduate from an American university (Yale College)
 1861–1865, Several dozen Asian-American volunteers enlist in the Union Army and Union Navy during the American Civil War. Smaller numbers serve in the armed forces of the Confederate States of America. 
 1861 The utopian minister Thomas Lake Harris of the Brotherhood of the New Life visits England, where he meets Nagasawa Kanaye, who becomes a convert. Nagasawa returns to the US with Harris and follows him to Fountaingrove in Santa Rosa, California. When Harris leaves the Californian commune, Nagasawa became the leader and remained there until his death in 1932.
 1862, California imposes a tax of $2.50 a month on every Chinese man.
 1865, The Central Pacific Railroad Co. recruits Chinese workers for the transcontinental railroad from California to Utah. Many are killed or injured in the harsh conditions blasting through difficult mountain terrain.
 1869, A group of Japanese build the Wakamatsu Tea and Silk Farm Colony in Gold Hill, California
 1869, The Fourteenth Amendment gives full citizenship to every person born in the United States, regardless of race.
 1877, Denis Kearney organizes anti-Chinese movement in San Francisco and forms the Workingmen's Party of California, alleging that Chinese workers took lower wages, poorer conditions, and longer hours than white workers were willing to tolerate.
 1878, Chinese are ruled ineligible for naturalized citizenship.
 1882, Chinese Exclusion Act is passed banning immigration of laborers from China. Students and businessmen are allowed. Large numbers of Chinese gain entry by claiming American birth.
 1884, Philip Jason, a Korean independence activist and physician who later became an American citizen among Koreans for the first time, arrived in the United States. 
 1885 The Rock Springs massacre in Wyoming leaves 28 Chinese miners dead.
 1887, Robbers kill 31 Chinese miners Snake River, Oregon.
 1890, In Hawaii, then an independent country, sugar plantations hire large numbers of Japanese, Chinese and Filipinos. They form a majority of the population by 1898.
 1898 Hawaii joins the U.S. as a territory. Most residents are Asian and they receive full U.S. citizenship.
 1898 The Philippines joins the U.S. as a territory. The residents of the Philippines become U.S. nationals but not citizens.

1901 to 1940

 1902, Yone Noguchi publishes The American Diary of a Japanese Girl.
 1903 Ahn Chang Ho, pen name Dosan, founded the Friendship Society in 1903 and the Mutual Assistant Society.
 1904, Seungman Rhee (이승만), comes to the U.S. to earn a B.A at George Washington University and a Ph.D. from Princeton University. In 1910, he returned to Korea and became a political activist during Japanese occupation of Korea. He later became the first president of South Korea.
 1906 The San Francisco Board of Education segregates Japanese students, but withdraws at the request of President Theodore Roosevelt and protests by the Japanese government.
 1907, Gentlemen's Agreement between United States and Japan that Japan would stop issuing passports for new laborers.
 1910, Angel Island in San Francisco Bay opens as the major station for as many as 175,000 Chinese and 60,000 Japanese immigrants between 1910 and 1940.
 1913, California bans Japanese immigrants ("Issei") from purchasing land; land is purchased instead in the names of U.S. born children ("Nisei") who are citizens
 1924, United States Immigration Act of 1924 (Oriental Exclusion Act) banned most immigration from Asia. The quota for most Asian countries is zero. Public opinion in Japan is outraged by the insult.
 1927, in the infamous case of Lum v. Rice the Supreme Court found that states possess the right to define a Chinese student as non-white for the purpose of segregating them in public schools.
 1930, Anti-Filipino riot occurred in Watsonville, California.
 1933, Filipinos are ruled ineligible for citizenship barring immigration. Roldan v. Los Angeles County found that existing California anti-miscegenation laws did not bar Filipino-white marriages, but the state quickly moved to amend the law and made it so that Filipinos could no longer marry White people.
 1935, Tydings-McDuffie Act gives "Commonwealth" status to the Philippines hence allowing immigration of Filipinos; Philippines independence is scheduled for 1946
 1940, Bruce Lee was born November 27, 1940, in the Chinatown area of San Francisco, California.

1941-1999
 1941, Japanese navy attacks Pearl Harbor; FBI arrests pro-Japanese community leaders in Hawaii and U.S.
 1941, Japanese army invades Philippines; Japanese residents support the invaders
 1941–1945 Filipino resistance movement, working closely with U.S. Army, fights the Japanese invaders
 1942, President Franklin D. Roosevelt signs Executive Order 9066 on February 19, ordering the internment of Japanese Americans. The action uprooted more than 100,000 people of Japanese descent on the U.S. West Coast; similar actions take place in Canada.
 1943, Japanese-American soldiers from Hawaii join the U.S. Army 100th Battalion arrive in Europe.
 1944, U.S. Army 100th Battalion merges with the all-volunteer Asian Americans of Japanese descent 442nd Regimental Combat Team
 1945, 442nd Regimental Combat team awarded 18,143 decorations including 9,486 Purple Heart decorations becoming the highest decorated military unit in United States history
 1946, the Luce–Celler Act of 1946 grants naturalization opportunities to Filipino Americans and Indian Americans (which included present-day Pakistanis and Bangladeshis) and re-established immigration from the Indian subcontinent and the Philippines.
1947–1989, Strong American interest in Asia during Cold War, especially Korea and Vietnam.
1947, Wataru Misaka a Japanese American was the first player of color and first American of Asian descent and the first non-Caucasian person to play in the National Basketball Association (NBA), known then as the Basketball Association of America (BAA) making him the person that broke the professional basketball color barrier the same year that Baseball player Jackie Robinson broke the Baseball color barrier.
 1948, Olympic divers Vicki Draves & Sammy Lee became the first Asian Americans to win an Olympic gold medal for the United States.
 1951, The Gallery of Madame Liu Tsong the first U.S. television series starring an Asian-American series lead was launched on the now defunct television network DuMont. The lead actress of the series was Anna May Wong the first female Asian American movie star and the first Chinese American movie star.
 1952 Walter–McCarran Act nullifies all federal anti-Asian exclusion laws and allows for naturalization of all Asians.
 1956, Dalip Singh Saund (1899–1973) first Asian to be elected for Congress; he is a Sikh from California
 1957, Japanese American James Kanno is elected mayor of Fountain Valley, California.
 1962, Professional American Football player Roman Gabriel, was the first Asian-American to start as an NFL quarterback.
 1962, Daniel K. Inouye of Hawaii elected for the US Senate; he wins reelection in 1968, 1974, 1980, 1986, 1992, 1998, 2004, and 2010
 1962, Wing Luke the first Asian American to hold elected office (Seattle City Council) in the State of Washington
 1963, Rocky Fellers, a Filipino American boy band is first Asian American to hit Billboard 100."Killer Joe" reached No. 16 on the Billboard Hot 100 in April 1963, No. 1 in both New York and Los Angeles, CA.
 1964, Grace Lee Boggs author and social activist, met with Malcolm X and unsuccessfully attempted to convince him to run for the United States Senate.
 1964, Senator Hiram Fong of Hawaii becomes first Asian American to run for President of the United States, as a favorite son candidate in his state's primary. He is also the first person from Hawaii to run for president, and runs again in 1968.
 1965, Yuri Kochiyama, human rights activist and Longtime friend to Malcolm X, on February 21, 1965, the day of his X's assassination, at the Audubon Ballroom in Harlem, she ran to him after he was shot and held him in her arms as he lay dying.
 1965, Patsy T. Mink of Hawaii becomes the first woman of color elected to Congress.
 1965, John Wing serves as Mississippi's first Chinese American mayor; he serves as mayor of Jonestown, Mississippi, through 1973.
 1965, Luck Wing serves four terms as the Mayor of Sledge, Mississippi with a population of 600. Wing served as mayor and significantly changed the Chinese American experience in the Mississippi Delta.
 1965, a group of mostly Filipino farm workers go on strike against growers of table grapes in California a strike which became known as the famous Delano grape strike they were led by the famous Filipino American activists and labor organizers Philip Vera Cruz and Larry Itliong.
 1970s–1980s, Asians Americans created their own distinct genre of jazz and launched a musical movement based around it.
 1971, Norman Y. Mineta elected mayor of San Jose, California; becomes first Asian American mayor of a major US city; Herbert Choy nominated supreme court justice.
 1972, Patsy Mink co-authors and sponsors the Title IX Amendment of the Higher Education Act and gets it effectively passed on June 23 the act was for the prohibition of gender discrimination in the U.S. education system or other federally funded institutions. In the same year, Mink also becomes the first Asian American woman to run for President of the United States, participating in the Oregon Democratic Primary.
 1973, Ruby Chow became the first Asian American elected to the King County Council in Washington State
 1974, George R. Ariyoshi elected governor of Hawaii
 1974, Eduardo Malapit elected mayor of Kauai, the first Filipino American mayor in the United States.
 1976, Samuel Ichiye (S. I.) Hayakawa of California and Spark Matsunaga of Hawaii elected as US Senators
 1977–1978, In June 1977 Reps. Frank Horton of New York and Norman Y. Mineta of California introduced a United States House of Representatives resolution to proclaim the first ten days of May as Asian-Pacific Heritage Week. A similar bill was introduced in the Senate a month later by Daniel Inouye and Spark Matsunaga. President Jimmy Carter signed a joint resolution for the celebration on October 5, 1978.
 1978, Ellison S. Onizuka becomes the first Asian American astronaut.
 1980s–present, Asian Americans have made dramatic advances as students and faculty in higher education, especially in California.  There have been sharp debates regarding the existence of discrimination against high-performing Asians.
 1980, Congress creates Commission on Wartime Relocation and Internment of Civilians to investigate internment of Japanese Americans; in 1983 it reports Japanese American internment was not a national security necessity
 1982, Vincent Chin, a Chinese American, was beaten to death in Highland Park, Michigan near Detroit. His murder became a rally point for Asian Americans. Vincent Chin's murder is often considered the beginning of a pan-ethnic Asian American movement.
 1988, President Ronald Reagan signs Civil Liberties Act of 1988 apologizing for Japanese American internment and provide reparations of $20,000 to each victim
 1989, Michael Chang was the first Chinese American to win the French Open, and reached a career best ranking of world No. 2 in 1996.
 1990, George H. W. Bush signed a bill passed by Congress to extend Asian-American Heritage Week to a month; May was officially designated as Asian/Pacific American Heritage Month two years later. 
 1992, Eugene Chung is a former American football offensive lineman who played in the National Football League from 1992 to 1997.
 1992, May was officially designated as Asian/Pacific American Heritage Month.
 1992, Hae Jong Kim elected Bishop of United Methodist Church; Paull Shin elected for Washington State Senate; Jay Kim becomes first Korean American elected to Congress (CA-41); LA Riots of April 1992.
 1993, Bobby Scott is elected to Congress from Virginia's 3rd congressional district. Scott is of African American and Filipino American descent, and is the first member of the United States Congress of Filipino ancestry.
 1994, Ben Cayetano is elected Governor of Hawaii, becoming the first Filipino American to be elected governor of a state.
 1996, Gary Locke is elected governor of Washington state. When he was elected in 1995 Locke became the first—and to date the only—Chinese American to serve as the governor of a state, holding the post for two terms.
 1999, Gen. Eric Shinseki becomes the first Asian American U.S. Army chief of staff.
 1999, David Wu is elected as Congressman for Oregon 1st District

21st century
 2000, Norman Y. Mineta. Democratic Congressman, appointed by President Bill Clinton as the first Asian American appointed to the U.S. Cabinet; worked as Commerce Secretary (2000–2001), Transportation Secretary (2001–2006).
 2000, Angela Perez Baraquio became the first Asian American, first Filipino American, and first teacher ever to have been crowned Miss America.
 2001, Elaine Chao was appointed by President George W. Bush as the Secretary of Labor, serving to 2009. She is the first Asian American woman to serve in the Cabinet.
 2002, less than a month after the death of Rep. Patsy Mink, Congress passed a resolution to rename Title IX the "Patsy Takemoto Mink Equal Opportunity in Education Act.
2003, Ignatius C. Wang is an American bishop of the Roman Catholic Church. He served as Auxiliary Bishop of the Archdiocese of San Francisco from 2002 to 2009.
 2008, Cung Le, first Asian American to win a major mma title by defeating Frank Shamrock via TKO in Strikeforce.
 2008, Bruce Reyes-Chow, 3rd generation Filipino and Chinese American, was elected as the moderator of 2 million members of the Presbyterian Church (USA).
 2008, Tim Lincecum, a starting pitcher for the San Francisco Giants, is selected as an All Star for the Major League All Star Game. Lincecum, who is half-Filipino, also won the Cy Young award as the most successful pitcher in the National League in 2008. Lincecum is the first Asian American to be selected as the Cy Young winner. Lincecum also won the Cy Young again in 2009 and led the Giants to a World Series victory in 2010.
 2009, Steven Chu, co-winner of the 1997 Nobel Prize for Physics, is sworn in as U.S. Secretary of Energy—thereby becoming the first person appointed to the US Cabinet after having won a Nobel Prize. He is also the second Chinese American to become a member of Cabinet (after Elaine Chao).
 2009, Joseph Cao, a Republican, is the first Vietnamese American and person born in Vietnam elected to the U.S. House of Representatives, from Louisiana's 2nd congressional district; he was defeated for reelection in 2010.
 2009, Judy Chu is the first Chinese American woman elected to the U.S. Congress.
 2009, Gary Locke is appointed by President Obama to serve as the Secretary of Commerce.
 2009, Dr. Jim Yong Kim is appointed as President of Dartmouth College, becoming the first Asian American president of an Ivy League School.
 2010, Immigration from Asia surpassed immigration from Latin America. Many of these immigrants are recruited by American companies from college campuses in India, China, and South Korea.
 2010, Daniel Inouye is sworn in as President Pro Tempore making him the highest-ranking Asian-American politician in American history.
 2010, Far East Movement is the second Asian American band to top the Billboard 100, second only to Rocky Fellers with its song "Like a G6". The song was number one on two separate weeks in November 2010.
 2010, Jeremy Lin is the first American-born Taiwanese to become an NBA player. Lin was a star basketball player for Harvard University and excelled at NBA pre-draft camps. Lin is currently a player for the Santa Cruz Warriors of the NBA G League.
 2010, Jean Quan is elected as Mayor of Oakland, California. Quan is the first Asian American woman elected mayor of a major American city. Quan is Oakland's first Asian American mayor.
 2010, Ed Lee is appointed as Mayor of San Francisco, California.
 2010, Ed Wang was the first full-blooded Chinese player to both be drafted and to play in the NFL.
 2011, Gary Locke becomes U.S. Ambassador to the People's Republic of China.
 2013, Nina Davuluri became the second Asian American and first Indian American to be crowned as Miss America. She is the second Asian American following Angela Perez Baraquio in 2000.
 2015, Bobby Jindal, Governor of Louisiana (2008—present), becomes the first Indian American to run for President of the United States, and is the first Asian American to run a nationwide campaign to seek the United States Presidency.
 2016, Kamala Harris was elected to the United States Senate from California, and is the first Indian American to serve as a United States Senator.
 2016, President-elect Donald Trump announces his intention to nominate Nikki Haley to serve as United States Ambassador to the United Nations. Haley is confirmed January 2017 and is the first Asian American and Indian American to serve as United Nations Ambassador.
 2017, Elaine Chao was appointed by President Donald Trump to serve as the Secretary of Transportation.
2017, Simon Tam wins a unanimous case at the Supreme Court for Matal v. Tam (the right to register The Slants' trademark).
2018, Noel Francisco was appointed by President Donald Trump to serve as the Solicitor General.
2019, Kamala Harris becomes first Indian American woman to campaign for the United States. 
2021, Kamala Harris is sworn in as the first Multiracial American, Indian American, Asian American, African American, and female Vice President of the United States.

See also
 East Asia–United States relations
 Asian Americans
 Asian American immigration history
 Asian American political history
 Military history of Asian Americans
 Asian Pacific American Heritage Month
Histories of specific ethnic/national subgroups:
 Chinese American history
 Cambodian American history
 Filipino American history
 Immigration history of Hmong Americans
 Indian American history
 Japanese American history
 Korean American history
 Vietnamese American history

Further reading

Reference books
 Chen, Edith Wen-Chu, and Grace J. Yoo, eds. Encyclopedia of Asian American Issues Today (2 vol, 2009)  excerpt and text search
 Huang, Guiyou, ed. The Greenwood Encyclopedia of Asian American Literature (3 vol. 2008)  excerpt and text search
 Japanese American National Museum. Encyclopedia of Japanese American History: An A-To-Z Reference from 1868 to the Present (2nd ed. 2000)
 Kim, Hyung-Chan, ed. Dictionary of Asian American History (1986) 629pp; online edition
 Lee, Jonathan H.X. and Kathleen M. Nadeau, eds. Encyclopedia of Asian American Folklore and Folklife (3 vol. 2010)
 Lee, Jonathan H.X. History of Asian Americans: Exploring Diverse Roots (2015)
 Ng, Franklin. The Asian American Encyclopedia (6 vol., 1995)
 Oh, Seiwoong, ed.. Encyclopedia of Asian-American Literature (2007)
 Okihiro, Gary Y. American History Unbound: Asians and Pacific Islanders (University of California Press, 2015). xiv, 499 pp.

Surveys by scholars
 Chan, Sucheng. Asian Americans: an interpretive history (Twayne, 1991). 
 Fuchs, Lawrence H. Hawaii Pono: An Ethnic and Political History (1997)
 Lee, Shelley Sang-Hee. A New History of Asian America (2014)
 Okihiro, Gary Y. The Columbia Guide to Asian American History  (2001) online edition excerpt and text search
 Okihiro, Gary Y. Margins and Mainstreams: Asians in American History and Culture (University of Washington Press, 2014)
 Takaki, Ronald Strangers from a Different Shore: A History of Asian Americans New York: Little, Brown, 1998.

Historiography
 Chan, Sucheng. "The changing contours of Asian-American historiography", Rethinking History, March 2007, Vol. 11 Issue 1, pp 125–147; surveys 100+ studies of defining events; Asian diasporas; social dynamics; cultural histories.
 Chan, Sucheng. "Asian American historiography," Pacific Historical Review, Aug 1996, Vol. 65#3 pp. 363–99
 Espiritu, Augusto. "Transnationalism and Filipino American Historiography," Journal of Asian American Studies, June 2008, Vol. 11#2 pp. 171–184,
 Friday, Chris. "Asian American Labor and Historical Interpretation," Labor History, Fall 1994, Vol. 35#4 pp. 524–546,
 Gregory, Peter N. "Describing the Elephant: Buddhism in American," Religion and American Culture,  Summer 2001, Vol. 11#2 pp. 233–63
 Kim, Lili M. "Doing Korean American History in the Twenty-First Century,"  Journal of Asian American Studies, June 2008, Vol. 11@2 pp 199–209
 
 Lee, Erika, "Orientalisms in the Americas: A Hemispheric Approach to Asian American History," Journal of Asian American Studies vol 8#3 (2005) pp 235–256. Notes that 30–40% of the Chinese and Japanese immigrants before 1941 went to Latin America, especially Brazil, and many others went to Canada.
 Ngai, Mae M. "Asian American History—Reflections on the De-centering of the Field," Journal of American Ethnic History, Summer 2006, Vol. 25#4 pp 97–108
 Okihiro, Gary Y. The Columbia Guide to Asian American History (2001) excerpt and text search
 Okihiro, Gary Y. Common Ground: Reimagining American History (2001)  excerpt and text search
 Tamura, Eillen H. "Historiographical Essay," History of Education Quarterly, Spring 2001, Vol. 41#1 pp. 58–71
 Tamura, Eillen H. "Using the Past to Inform the Future: An Historiography of Hawaii's Asian and Pacific Islanders," Amerasia Journal, 2000, Vol. 26#1 pp. 55–85

References

 
Immigration to the United States